The 1924 New York Giants season was the franchise's 42nd season.  The team finished first in the National League with a record of 93–60, winning the NL pennant for the fourth consecutive season, a record that still stands, as of 2020. They went on to the World Series, losing to the Washington Senators in seven games.

Regular season
In the final series of the 1924 season, the Giants were playing the Philadelphia Phillies at the Polo Grounds and battling for the pennant with the Robins. Giants outfielder Jimmy O'Connell offered Phillies shortstop Heinie Sand $500 to throw the games. Sand rejected the bribe and reported it to Phillies manager Art Fletcher. It eventually led to the lifetime suspension of O'Connell and Giants coach Cozy Dolan by Commissioner Landis, although future-Hall of Famers Frankie Frisch, George Kelly, and Ross Youngs were also implicated.

Season standings

Record vs. opponents

Opening Day lineup

Roster

Player stats

Batting

Starters by position 
Note: Pos = Position; G = Games played; AB = At bats; H = Hits; Avg. = Batting average; HR = Home runs; RBI = Runs batted in

Other batters
Note: G = Games played; AB = At bats; H = Hits; Avg. = Batting average; HR = Home runs; RBI = Runs batted in

Pitching

Starting pitchers
Note: G = Games pitched; IP = Innings pitched; W = Wins; L = Losses; ERA = Earned run average; SO = Strikeouts

Other pitchers
Note: G = Games pitched; IP = Innings pitched; W = Wins; L = Losses; ERA = Earned run average; SO = Strikeouts

Relief pitchers
Note: G = Games pitched; W = Wins; L = Losses; SV = Saves; ERA = Earned run average; SO = Strikeouts

1924 World Series

Game 1
October 4, 1924, at Griffith Stadium in Washington, D.C.

Game 2
October 5, 1924, at Griffith Stadium in Washington, D.C.

Game 3
October 6, 1924, at the Polo Grounds (IV) in New York City

Game 4
October 7, 1924, at the Polo Grounds (IV) in New York City

Game 5
October 8, 1924, at the Polo Grounds (IV) in New York City

Game 6
October 9, 1924, at Griffith Stadium in Washington, D.C.

Game 7
October 10, 1924, at Griffith Stadium in Washington, D.C.

References

External links
 1924 New York Giants at Baseball Reference
 1924 New York Giants at Baseball Almanac

New York Giants (NL)
San Francisco Giants seasons
New York Giants season
National League champion seasons
New York G
1920s in Manhattan
Washington Heights, Manhattan